Silviano Delgado Valladolid  (born 4 September 1969) is a Mexican former professional footballer, who played as a midfielder during his nine-year career in Mexico's top tier Puebla, Toluca, and Morelia.

International career
At international level, he was a member of the Mexico national under-23 football team competing at the 1992 Summer Olympics in Barcelona, Spain. Delgado started all three matches in the tournament.

References

External links
playerhistory 
sports-reference

1969 births
Living people
People from Coatzacoalcos
Footballers from Veracruz
Mexican footballers
Association football midfielders
Olympic footballers of Mexico
Footballers at the 1992 Summer Olympics
Club Puebla players
Deportivo Toluca F.C. players
Atlético Morelia players
Liga MX players